Otremba or Otręba is a surname. Pronounced identically, both forms occur in Poland but the standard spelling, Otręba, is twice as common. In other countries, Otremba may be more frequent to prevent mispronunciation.

Otremba/Otręba is the Polish equivalent of the Czech surname Otruba. Both mean bran.

Notable people with the surname include:

Ken Otremba (1948–1997), American politician
Mary Ellen Otremba (1950–2014), American politician

See also
 

Polish-language surnames